Jocara parallelalis is a species of snout moth. It is found in Peru.

References

Moths described in 1916
Jocara